Semirom (also Romanized as Semīrom, Samirum, and Sīmrom) is a city and capital of Semirom County, Isfahan Province, Iran. At the 2006 census, its population was 26,260, in 6,593 families.

Products and Popularity
Semirom produces apples. The high altitude of 2,000 meters above sea level gives apples produced in Semirom region their characteristically sweet taste, aroma and color. Semirom apple had been target of international research funds to protect and excel its gardens.

Semirom Riot
Unrest started on August 16, 2003, after a decision by the Isfahan Governor General's Office to incorporate the Vardasht district of Semirom into the municipality of Dehaqan provoked the ire of the people of Vardasht. The people staged a demonstration to protest the decision, and the protests turned violent. Eight people were reportedly killed in the violence, including two police officers, and some 150 were injured. 
Later Hosseini, the governor of Isfahan at the time, in an interview with Shargh newspaper denied any involvement in ordering police to confront the people, and said the number of killed was four.

Climate

References

Populated places in Semirom County
Cities in Isfahan Province